Samsung SCH-U450 is a side-slider text messaging mobile phone. It was released September 16, 2009 to Verizon Wireless as the Intensity and on Alltel as the DoubleTake.

Features
The features of SCH-U450 include: a QWERTY keyboard, Bluetooth, MP3 player, SMS, Mobile IM and emailing, and a 1.3 MP camera for photos only. Video filming is not supported. The phone comes in three different colors; flamingo red, black and blue. The phone also has a Micro SD card slot that is accessible by removing the back plate.

References

External links
 Samsung Intensity (U450) Review Phone Arena
 Samsung Intensity Review (CNET)

SCH-u450
Mobile phones introduced in 2009